Don't Quote Me is a brand developed by Wiggles 3D. The company is a games and entertainment publisher. The company has developed a line of Don't Quote Me board games and also has an online quotations database.

Board games
The original Don't Quote Me game features quotes from historical figures and current celebrities. It won GAMES Magazine's GAMES 100 award in 2004. Other versions of the game include a TV edition, a children's edition and a sports edition.

A public Facebook app lets users play the original Don't Quote Me game online.

Puzzles
Don't Quote Me has a series of syndicated newspaper puzzles. The puzzles all feature quotations. Don't Quote Me has a series of syndicated newspaper puzzles that appear daily in print and online in USA Today.

A different type of quote puzzle, called a QuoteSlide, appears daily on Shockwave.com and Games.com.

Books
In 2008, the editors at Don't Quote Me produced a quotations book. Called Beltway Bloopers: Hilarious Quotes and Anecdotes from Washington, D.C., it was published by Metro Books. The book is a collection of political quotations.

External links
Official Website
Game instructions for the original game
Listing of original game on BoardGameGeek
Review of the original game on About.com
Review of the Time For Kids edition by Tom Vasel on BoardGameGeek
Review of the Time For Kids edition on About.com
Review of the Sports Illustrated edition by Tom Vasel on BoardGameGeek

Board games introduced in 2003
Party board games
Canadian board games